Tajuria yajna, the  Purple royal, is a butterfly in the family Lycaenidae. It was described by William Doherty in 1886. It is found in the Indomalayan realm.

Subspecies
Tajuria yajna yajna (north-western India)
Tajuria yajna cato Druce, 1895 (Borneo)
Tajuria yajna ellisi Evans, [1925] (Burma, Thailand)
Tajuria yajna istroidea de Nicéville, 1887 (Assam)
Tajuria yajna selangorana Pendlebury & Corbet, 1933 (Peninsular Malaysia)
Note Yunnan Only one male is known and it shows more similarities to ssp.yajna from N.W. India than to ssp. ellisi Evans from Burma

References

External links
Tajuria at Markku Savela's Lepidoptera and Some Other Life Forms

Tajuria
Butterflies described in 1886